David Thomas Fällman (born 4 February 1990) is a Swedish footballer who plays for Aalesund as a defender.

Club career

Early career
Fällman grew up in Mariefred, and started his senior career in 2007 with Eskilstuna City in Division 2, Sweden's fourth tier.

He moved to Stockholm-based Väsby United in 2009. Across three seasons, Fällman played as a regular in Superettan, Sweden's second tier, with the club and made 67 league appearances.

In the beginning of 2012, Fällman signed a three-month deal with AIK, but was not offered a contract extension with the club.

Gefle IF
On 21 March 2012, Fällman signed a multi-year contract with Gefle IF in Allsvenskan.

He soon established himself as a key player in manager Pelle Olsson's side, and he was named the new club captain in 2015.

In total, Fällman made 111 league appearances for Gelfe IF across four seasons in the Swedish top division.

Dalian Transcendence
In January 2016, Fällman moved abroad for the first time in his career, signing a two-year deal with Dalian Transcendence in the China League One.

Hammarby IF
On 16 February 2018, Fällman returned to Sweden and signed a three-year deal with Hammarby IF. He played 27 games during his debut season, scoring once, as Hammarby finished 4th in the table.

In April 2019, Fällman was appointed joint-captain of Hammarby together with Jeppe Andersen. His season was however plagued by a groin injury, and Fällman only made 18 appearances as Hammarby finished 3rd in Allsvenskan.

Aalesunds FK
On 15 February 2021, Fällman completed a transfer to Aalesunds FK.

Personal life
Fällman is the cousin of Marcus Danielson, a fellow footballer that has represented the Swedish national team.

References

External links
 

1990 births
Living people
Association football defenders
AFC Eskilstuna players
AIK Fotboll players
Gefle IF players
Dalian Transcendence F.C. players
Hammarby Fotboll players
Aalesunds FK players
China League One players
Expatriate footballers in China
Superettan players
Allsvenskan players
Swedish footballers
Eskilstuna City FK players
Footballers from Stockholm